William Wass (16 November 1922 – October 2009) was an English professional footballer who played as a right winger.

Career
Born in Ryhope, Wass spent his early career with Murton Colliery Welfare and Middlesbrough. He signed for Bradford City from Middlesbrough in July 1946. He made 7 league appearances for the club, scoring 1 goal, before being released in 1947.

Sources

References

1922 births
2009 deaths
English footballers
Murton A.F.C. players
Middlesbrough F.C. players
Bradford City A.F.C. players
English Football League players
Association football wingers